Moree Airport  is an airport in Moree, New South Wales, Australia. The airport has some scheduled services but mainly provides general aviation facilities, maintenance and support for agricultural aviation in the local area. The Moree Aero Club has been based at the airport since 1952, and today provides aircraft hire and flight training. The club was instrumental in providing many early improvements to the aerodrome facilities, including hangars and a terminal building. In the 2021-22 Financial Year, Moree Airport handled 18,073 passengers, down from approximately 35,000 per year before travel restrictions were introduced as a result of the response to the COVID-19 pandemic.

Airport facilities
Moree airport has two operational runways. The primary runway 01/19 is sealed with an asphalt surface . This runway is equipped with pilot-operated lighting for night operations, as well as precision approach path indicator installations at each end. Although this runway strip itself is constructed from gravel, the central  is maintained as a sealed surface. The airport does not have a control tower as the typical volume of traffic is not high. Pilots are required to communicate via a Common Traffic Advisory Frequency (CTAF) to safely co-ordinate arrivals and departures. A Non-Directional Beacon (NDB) to the west of the airport is the only navigational aid.

The small passenger terminal and apron are located on the eastern side of the airport, with road access off the Newell Highway. On the western side of the airport is an area primarily used to support agricultural crop spraying and other associated airwork.

Airlines and destinations

The Moree-Sydney route is one of 14 within New South Wales regulated by the state government. Prior to 30 March 2013, the route had been served by up to 20 weekly QantasLink flights, using Bombardier Dash 8 turboprop airliners. Controversially, this ended with the awarding of the licence to Brindabella Airlines on behalf of Transport New South Wales following a tender process. The move was met by considerable opposition within the Moree community, with concerns being raised about a lack of consultation, reduced baggage allowance, loss of frequent flyer program benefits as well as smaller aircraft operating the route and less operational flexibility in the event of delays or cancellations. Prior to 27 January 2012, Brindabella Airlines operated weekday services to Brisbane, but these flights ceased after the company reviewed services to the region following a merger with Aeropelican, a move which damaged the airline's reputation in the local community. In December 2013, concerns relating to overdue maintenance on some of its aircraft led to the Civil Aviation Safety Authority grounding Brindabella Airlines. The airline was subsequently put into receivership and ceased operations, with the Sydney-Moree route licence returning to QantasLink.

In July 2016, Fly Corporate announced that it would begin services between Moree and Brisbane from August 2016 using Fairchild Metro aircraft.

Incidents and accidents
On the evening of 30 March 2011, a privately operated Piper PA-32R-301T Turbo Saratoga struck trees and crashed approximately  short of the threshold on approach to runway 19. Of the pilot and five passengers aboard, four were fatally injured. Three members of the same well known family who ran local farming, hardware and petroleum businesses were killed. The pilot was also a well respected local businessman. During the approach, which was made after dusk, the aircraft flew too low, struck treetops on the fenceline of a nearby caravan park, and came to rest upside down in an adjacent field. The aircraft was found to be overloaded, and the pilot's lack of recent night flying experience was a contributing factor.
The aircraft was on a ferry flight from St George, Queensland en route to Moree Airport.

See also
List of airports in New South Wales

References

External links
Airport Guide

Airports in New South Wales
Airports established in 1952